This is a list of listed buildings in Fredensborg Municipality, Denmark.

The list

2980 Kokkedal

2990 Nivå

3050 Humlebæk

3480 Fredensborg

Delisted buildings

References

External links

 Danish Agency of Culture

 
Fredensborg